Heimo Immanuel Linna (11 December 1925 – 14 November 2022) was a Finnish farmer and politician. A member of the Centre Party, he served in the Parliament from 1966 to 1987 and as Minister of Agriculture and Forestry from 1973 to 1975 and again from 1975 to 1976.

Linna died in Kannus on 14 November 2022, at the age of 96.

References

1925 births
2022 deaths
Finnish farmers
Ministers of Agriculture of Finland
Members of the Parliament of Finland (1966–70)
Members of the Parliament of Finland (1970–72)
Members of the Parliament of Finland (1972–75)
Members of the Parliament of Finland (1975–79)
Members of the Parliament of Finland (1979–83)
Members of the Parliament of Finland (1983–87)
Centre Party (Finland) politicians
People from Perho